Clonlonan is a barony in south–west County Westmeath, Ireland. It was formed by 1672. It is bordered by County Offaly to the south and a small part of County Roscommon at Long Island on the River Shannon to the west. It also borders four other Westmeath baronies: Kilkenny West and Rathconrath (to the north), Moycashel (to the north–east) and Brawny (to the west). The largest centre of population in the barony is the town of Moate.

Geography

The Boor River runs west from near Moate, and flows into the River Shannon at the boundary of Westmeath and County Offaly.

Two significant roads pass through the barony. The M6, a motorway forming part of the N6 Dublin to Galway national primary road and the N62 connecting the M6 to the M8. In addition the R390, a regional road linking Athlone to Mullingar, the R444 linking the R357 at Shannonbridge, County Offaly with the N6 and the R446, part of the old N6 prior to the motorway, also feature.

A railway line carrying several of the national rail company Iarnród Éireann's intercity services also passes through the barony.

Civil parishes of the barony 
This table lists an historical geographical sub-division of the barony known as the civil parish (not to be confused with an Ecclesiastical parish).

Towns, villages and townlands

Moate, a town on the Cloghatanny River, also known as the Moate Stream, which is a tributary of the River Brosna.
Bealin
Fardrum
Mount Temple, a village about 6.5 km north–west of Moate.
Moyvoughly, a hamlet north of Moate.

There are 130 townlands in the barony of Clonlonan.

Places of interest
Moate Castle, a former fortified house, built about 1550.

References

External links
Map of the barony of Clonlonan at openstreetmap.org
Barony of Clonlonan, County Westmeath at townlands.ie

Baronies of County Westmeath